The Madrid Open is a defunct tennis tournament on the WTA Tour, held between 1996 and 2003. It replaced the International Championships of Spain (held in Barcelona) during these years, before a new tournament was started in Barcelona in 2007. It was a Tier II event in 1996 but was lowered to Tier III from 1997 onwards until it finished in 2003.

Jana Novotná was the most successful player at the event, winning the singles title in 1996 and 1997. Monica Seles also reached the final on two occasions, winning the title once.

Champions

Singles

Doubles

See also
 Spanish Open
 Madrid Open
 Madrid Tennis Grand Prix
 List of tennis tournaments

References
ITF Search (search Madrid)

External links
ITF website

 
Defunct tennis tournaments in Spain
WTA Tour
Recurring sporting events established in 1996
Recurring events disestablished in 2003